Daniel Slaughter may refer to:

 D. French Slaughter Jr. (1925–1998), member of the United States House of Representatives
 Daniel F. Slaughter (1799–1882), Virginia planter and politician